George Fox-Lane, 1st Baron Bingley (circa 1697 – 22 February 1773) was a British peer and Tory politician.

Born George Fox, he was the first son and heir of Henry Fox and his second wife, Hon. Frances Lane, the daughter of George Lane, 1st Viscount Lanesborough and his third wife Lady Frances Sackville. His father was the son of Major Joseph Fox of Graigue,  County Tipperary and the Hon. Thomasine Blayney.

From 1734 to 1741, he was Member of Parliament for Hindon and then for the City of York from 1742 to 1761. In 1750, he took the additional name of Lane by an Act of Parliament in 1750, on succeeding to the estates of his maternal half-uncle, James Lane, 2nd Viscount Lanesborough. On 12 July 1731, he married Hon. Harriet Benson (c.1705-1771), the only child of Robert Benson, 1st Baron Bingley; their only child was Robert Fox-Lane (died 1768). He was Lord Mayor of York for 1757.

On 13 May 1762, Lane-Fox's father-in-law's extinct title was re-created, when he was created Baron Bingley, of Bingley in the County of York, with remainder only to his heirs male with his wife, Harriet. As his only son died in 1768 and his wife in 1771, the title became extinct on his own death in 1773.

References

 

1690s births
1773 deaths
Barons in the Peerage of Great Britain
British MPs 1734–1741
British MPs 1741–1747
British MPs 1747–1754
British MPs 1754–1761
Members of the Parliament of Great Britain for English constituencies
Lord Mayors of York
English landowners
George